Bustamante is a toponymic surname originating in the town Bustamante which is part of the Cantabria region in northern Spain. Notable people with the surname include:
Alexander Bustamante (William Alexander Clarke Bustamante) (1884–1977), Jamaican politician and labor leader
Alyssa Bustamante
Anastasio Bustamante (1780–1853), President of Mexico (1830–1832, 1837–1841)
Antonio Sánchez de Bustamante y Sirven (1865–1951), Cuban jurist
Bianca Bustamante (born 2005), Filipino racing driver
Carlos Bustamante (biophysicist) (born 1951), Peruvian-American scientist, professor of biology, physics, and chemistry
Carlos María Bustamante (1774–1848), Mexican statesman and historian
Cruz Bustamante (born 1953), American politician, Lieutenant Governor of California (1999–2007)
David Bustamante (born 1982), Spanish singer
Ernesto Bustamante (born 1950), Peruvian scientist, professor, and entrepreneur
Francisco Bustamante (born 1963), Filipino pocket billiards player
Francisco Bustamante (painter) (c. 1680–1737), Spanish painter
Gladys Bustamante (1912–2009), Jamaican activist
Hector Luis Bustamante (born 1972), Colombian actor
Jean-Marc Bustamante (born 1952), French artist, sculptor, and photographer
José Bustamante y Rivero (1894–1989), President of Peru (1945–1948)
José de Bustamante (1759–1825), Spanish naval officer, explorer, and politician
José María Bustamante (1777–1861), Mexican composer
Juby Bustamante (1938–2014), Spanish journalist
Manuel Aguilar y Bustamante (1750–1819), Salvadoran ecclesiastic and revolutionary
Manela Bustamante (1924–2005), Cuban-Puerto Rican actress
Mariano Bustamante (1831–1879), Peruvian war hero
Monika Bustamante (contemporary), Anime performer
Murilo Bustamante (born 1966), Brazilian martial arts champion
Ric Bustamante (born 1923), Filipino actor
Teodoro Sánchez de Bustamante (1778–1851), Argentine statesman, lawyer and soldier.

Other towns
Bustamante, Nuevo León, Mexico

See also
Bustamante Industrial Trade Union, Jamaican trade union
Bahía Bustamante, a village and municipality in the Escalante Department, southern Argentina

Spanish-language surnames